Will Rogers State Beach is a beach park on the Santa Monica Bay, at the Pacific coast of Southern California. Located in the Pacific Palisades neighborhood of Los Angeles, the beach is owned by the California Department of Parks and Recreation; however, it is managed and maintained by the Los Angeles County Department of Beaches and Harbors. A section just south of the intersection of Pacific Coast Highway and Entrada Drive is popular within the LGBT community and is therefore considered Los Angeles' unofficial gay beach;  this section is often referred to as Ginger Rogers Beach.

Overview

The beach extends one and three quarters miles along the coast. 
It has many facilities, including volleyball courts, gymnastic equipment, restrooms, a playground, and a bike path. The bike path is part of the South Bay Bicycle Trail and extends  along the shore to Torrance, California. The beach is also a popular surf spot.

Many films and television shows have been filmed at the beach, including Creature from the Black Lagoon, The Kiss, La Belle dame sans merci, Summer Children, Holidays with Heather, and Hangman. Also, the television show Baywatch was shot at the beach before it moved to Hawaii.

In the sea near Will Rogers State Beach at Sunset Blvd., there is the grounding electrode of the Pacific DC Intertie.

History

The beach is named after actor, commentator and humorist Will Rogers, and partly originated with his property. In the 1920s, Rogers bought the land and developed a ranch along the coast and upland past today's Sunset Boulevard. He owned  in all, in what is now Pacific Palisades, beginning with about 1300 feet along the beach. Rogers died in a plane crash in 1935. Before his widow Betty's death in 1944, she developed a plan to gift their oceanfront to the state as the core of the original Will Rogers State Beach, which then ran 6300 feet of coastline in total. The beach was dedicated on July 26, 1942, with California Governor Culbert Olson and Los Angeles Mayor Fletcher Bowron on hand. 

The state beach should not be confused with the nearby Will Rogers State Historic Park north of Sunset Boulevard, formed from a similar gift by Betty Rogers of 186 acres of the original contiguous Rogers ranch deeded on June 8, 1944, two weeks before her death.

 The Will Rogers State Beach lifeguard headquarters is the site of the former Port of Los Angeles Long Wharf, a California Historical Landmark, site number 881.

Gallery

See also
 Will Rogers State Historic Park
List of beaches in California
List of California state parks
 California State Beaches

References

External links 

 Official website
 Weather conditions at WatchtheWater.org
 Los Angeles County Beaches and Harbors – Will Rogers State Beach

Beaches of Southern California
California State Beaches
Parks in Los Angeles
Parks in Los Angeles County, California
Beaches of Los Angeles County, California
Santa Monica, California
Tourist attractions in Santa Monica, California